Ikemefuna Patrick "Ickey" Ekwonu (born October 31, 2000) is an American football offensive tackle for the Carolina Panthers of the National Football League (NFL). Of Nigerian descent, he played college football at N.C. State where he was named a unanimous All-American and was awarded the Jacobs Blocking Trophy as the best blocker in the Atlantic Coast Conference in 2021. Ekwonu was selected sixth overall by the Carolina Panthers in the 2022 NFL Draft.

Early life and high school
Ekwonu grew up around Matthews, North Carolina, and attended Providence Day School. Ekwonu committed to play college football at North Carolina State over numerous Power 5 offers.

College career
Ekwonu started the final seven games of his freshman season at left tackle and led the team with 37 pancake blocks and was named to the FWAA Freshman All-America team. He began his sophomore season as the Wolfpack's starting left guard. Ekwonu was moved back to left tackle during the season and again led the Wolfpack with 50 pancake blocks and 22 knockdowns and was named second-team All-Atlantic Coast Conference (ACC) at both guard and tackle by the Associated Press. 

Ekwonu was named preseason All-ACC as well as a preseason All-American by Pro Football Focus and Sporting News going into the 2021 season. He was awarded the Jacobs Blocking Trophy as the best blocker in the ACC and was also a unanimous All-American selection.

Professional career

Following the end of the 2021 season, Ekwonu announced that he would forgo his remaining college eligibility to enter the 2022 NFL Draft, where he was selected in the first round with the sixth overall pick by the Carolina Panthers. On May 11, 2022, Ekwonu signed a four-year deal with the Panthers worth $27.6 million featuring a signing bonus of $17.2 million and a fifth year-option. As a rookie, he played in and started all 17 games for the Panthers in the 2022 season.

Personal life
Ekwonu majored in business administration at NC State. His father was a basketball player from Nigeria, while a twin brother, Osita, plays linebacker for the Notre Dame Fighting Irish. His nickname, Ickey, was given to him by a former coach who noted his resemblance to running back Ickey Woods.

Notes

References

External links 

 Carolina Panthers bio
 NC State Wolfpack bio

2000 births
Living people
American football offensive tackles
American sportspeople of Nigerian descent
NC State Wolfpack football players
Players of American football from Charlotte, North Carolina
All-American college football players
Carolina Panthers players
Twin sportspeople
American twins